The Janice Long Session EP is an EP by Danielle Dax, an English experimental musician and former member of The Lemon Kittens. It was later released as the BBC Sessions in the U.S. in 1991. It was recorded on 1 December 1985, and was first transmitted on 14 January 1986. The recording was later released in 1988 on the Strange Fruit Records label.

Dax provided vocals and played synthesizers, David Knight played synthesizers, Ian Sturgess played bass, and percussion, Steve Reeves played guitar, and Martyn Watts played drums. The cover artwork is by AJ Barratt / Retna Pictures Ltd.

Track listing 

 "Fizzing Human-Bomb" (3:39)
 "Pariah" (3:36)
 "Ostrich" (3:57)
 "Numb Companions" (3:20)

References

External links
Danielle Dax Official Website
Danielle Dax Myspace Site
Danielle Dax Artist Profile
The Danielle Dax Profile

1988 EPs
BBC Radio recordings
Live EPs
1988 live albums
Danielle Dax albums